John de Northwode was an English medieval churchman and university chancellor. He was the son of John de Northwode and Agnes, daughter of William de Grandison; and nephew of John de Grandison.

From 29 November 1329 until 1330, John de Northwode was Archdeacon of Exeter in Devon, southwest England. He held the post of Archdeacon of Totnes, also in Devon, from 1338 until 1349. He was appointed Chancellor  to the University of Oxford from 1345 to 1349. A commemorative brass plaque dedicated to his memory exists in the Collegiate Church of Ottery St Mary in Devon.

References

Year of birth unknown
Year of death unknown
14th-century English Roman Catholic priests
Archdeacons of Exeter
Archdeacons of Totnes
Chancellors of the University of Oxford